Umar Rasheed (born 25 December 1962) is a Pakistani first-class cricketer who played 146 First-class and 102 List A games.

References

External links
 

1962 births
Living people
Pakistani cricketers
Cricketers from Karachi
Hyderabad (Pakistan) cricketers
United Bank Limited cricketers
Karachi cricketers
Pakistan Automobiles Corporation cricketers
Pakistan National Shipping Corporation cricketers